Mumsy, Nanny, Sonny, and Girly, released as Girly outside the United Kingdom, is a 1970 British horror-comedy film. The film originated as a dream project for renowned cinematographer-turned-director Freddie Francis, who wanted the opportunity to direct a film over which he had complete creative control, instead of working on assignment from a studio (as was the case with his previous directorial efforts). Francis teamed with writer Brian Comport to build the movie around Oakley Court, which Francis had used for exterior shots in previous films. The script was based on a two-act play by Maisie Mosco titled Happy Family, which was adapted into a novella by screenwriter Brian Comport as "Mumsy, Nanny, Sonny, and Girly". Although the film fared poorly in British cinemas, it enjoyed a brief, successful run in North America, then achieved status as a cult film.

Plot
Four individuals live in a secluded manor house in the English countryside, where they engage in an elaborate role-playing fantasy called The Game. In The Game, each individual assumes the role of a member in a "happy" family, completely subsuming his or her individual personality to the point that each individual is known only by the identity he or she is playing: Mumsy (the mother, Ursula Howells), Nanny (the nanny, Pat Heywood), Sonny (the son, played by Howard Trevor), and Girly (the daughter, Vanessa Howard). The Game is built around a set of strictly enforced yet ill-defined rules, and the principal one is "Rule No. 1: Play the Game."

As a part of The Game, the teenaged Sonny and Girly regularly venture to more populated areas, where the pair use Girly to lure men back to the manor house. Once there, the men are dressed like schoolboys and forcibly indoctrinated into The Game, assuming the roles of "New Friends." Those who refuse are "sent to the Angels"—a euphemism for being ritualistically murdered in scenarios built around playground games, which Sonny routinely records on a 16mm movie camera so that the family can enjoy the resultant snuff film.

One night, Girly and Sonny stake out a swinging London party, where they encounter a male prostitute (Michael Bryant) and his latest client (Imogen Hassall). An instant attraction develops between Girly and the man, who convinces his client to accompany the siblings for a night of carousing. Girly and Sonny take the couple to a playground, where they murder the woman by throwing her from a large slide. The next morning, Sonny and Girly convince the hungover man that he murdered the woman after a night of heavy drinking, and they convince him to return to the manor with them. The prostitute—rechristened "New Friend"—is outfitted in schoolboy clothes and subjected to an indeterminate period of torment "playing the game," during which he is repeatedly presented with his client's body as a reminder that the family has incriminating information about him.

After Mumsy makes sexual overtures to New Friend one evening, he gets the idea to turn the family against itself. New Friend's plot succeeds as he creates sexual jealousy between the women after first sleeping with Mumsy and then Girly. Sonny, left out of the sexual politics, petitions to have New Friend "sent to the angels;" in a moment of panic, Girly bludgeons Sonny to death with an antique mirror. Chastising Girly for creating a mess, Mumsy dismisses Sonny as "naughty" and orders a visibly shaken New Friend to bury Sonny beneath a drained fountain on the manor grounds, which is populated by makeshift gravestones bearing the numerical identities assigned to dispatched "friends."

Nanny, jealous that she is the only female member of the household left out of New Friend's attentions, attempts to murder Mumsy with acid-tipped needles, but the attempt fails when it is inadvertently interrupted by New Friend. Girly, realising that Nanny has set her sights on New Friend, hacks Nanny to death with an axe and cooks her head for use in baked goods.

Rather than turn on one another, Mumsy and Girly declare a truce, deciding to "share" New Friend by alternating which days of the week each woman will be permitted to have sex with him. The two women agree, but ponder what will happen should either of them ever become bored with New Friend, with Girly's declaring it as an inevitability. Overhearing the women's conversation, New Friend retrieves—and hides—Nanny's acid tipped needles and settles into Mumsy's room, smiling.

Production
The film began as a dream project for Freddie Francis, a renowned cinematographer who had made the transition to directing at the beginning of the 1960s. Although he had numerous directorial credits to his name, each of these credits had come to him on commission from a studio, and Francis had dreamed of making a film over which he had complete creative control. Over the course of his career, Francis had shot several exterior scenes for films at Oakley Court, but lamented the fact that neither he nor any other director had the opportunity to film inside the building; in putting together his project, Francis decided that his film would be set in and around Oakley Court, with the script tailored to the building's unique landscaping and architecture.

Having never written a film himself, Francis hired writer Brian Comport to craft a screenplay, with the only condition being that the story had to be built around Oakley Court. Trying to come up with ideas, Francis and Comport attended the production of an off west end play titled The Happy Family, written by Maisie Mosco, then a radio playwright for the BBC. The play— influenced by Shirley Jackson's We Have Always Lived in the Castle and Tennessee Williams' Baby Doll—concerned a woman recently forced to undergo a hysterectomy by her abusive husband, who shortly thereafter left her for a younger woman. Having gone insane, the woman—redubbed Mumsy—forces her two children and her maid to join her in an elaborate role-playing game in which young societal drop-outs are welcomed into the family as new "children" for Mumsy. Both men thought that the play—which was overtly sexual and dealt explicitly with incest, lesbianism, and sadomasochism—was "terrible," but agreed that it was an excellent tipping-off point for a story that would take place at Oakley Court. Little of the play's story would survive into Comport's script, beyond the names of the principal characters and the basic premise of an isolated family engaging in a deadly role-playing game.

Owing to the film's origins as a stage production, Francis largely completed the casting with experienced stage performers who had made the transition to film, such as Ursula Howells, Pat Heywood, and Michael Bryant. The zookeeper whom Sonny and Girly harass in the film's opening sequence was played by Michael Ripper, a regular in Hammer Horror films whom Francis knew from his time working for the studio. Howard Trevor, who played Sonny, had only a single screen credit on an episode of the anthology series ITV Playhouse; Girly would prove to be his only film. Vanessa Howard, who had also gotten her start on ITV, was a relative newcomer who had starred in four films before Girly; she performed so well that it was decided in post-production that she would become the centerpiece of the film's marketing campaign, with the intention of turning the film into a star vehicle for her.

Reception
Girly was produced amid a backlash against indecency in the British media, brought in part by the production of more overtly sexual films targeted towards the mods and Swinging London. Media watchdogs latched onto a scene in the opening minutes of the film in which Girly suggestively sucks Sonny's finger after accepting a piece of candy from him. The scene was the result of Comport's having toyed with the idea of carrying over incest themes from the play, in which Sonny and Girly are explicitly engaged in a sexual relationship. Comport ultimately decided against this idea, deciding it was more thematically appropriate to the film to imply incest but never confirm it. Although the scene is the only implication of incest in the film, it came to be the film's definitive moment in contemporary media reviews.

Coincidentally, Girly was released concurrently with Goodbye Gemini, about a mentally imbalanced young man sexually obsessed with his sister. The two pictures created a moral panic among British media watchdogs and were held up as indicative of the state of the British media. Due to this backlash, few theatres wished to screen the film following its West End premier.

In an attempt to recoup losses, the film was rebranded for release in the United States, where exploitation films were enjoying moderate success. Retitled simply Girly, the film's advertising campaign was retooled to be built exclusively around Vanessa Howard, removing all of her costars from the film's posters. The film performed surprisingly well, even achieving a positive writeup in Variety.

Legacy
The film's failure at the British box office led to Vanessa Howard's decision to retire from acting in 1972; at the time of her decision, she was unaware of the film's success in America and remained uninformed for some time. Despite the film's financial failure, Francis maintained for the rest of his life that it had been his best work and his personal favourite of all the films he made.

The film disappeared from cinemas in America and England for several years. The film was released to VHS in North America (again under the title of Girly); copies proved difficult to obtain in the United Kingdom as the organizers of a Freddie Francis film festival in 2004 were unable to turn up a print or VHS copy of the film to screen. Around 2006, bootleg copies of the film began to surface on the Internet. Shortly thereafter, Salvation Films announced that it had obtained the rights to release Girly on DVD. The release entered development hell, with Salvation's promising the film's upcoming release on its website for the next three years. In the interim, Freddie Francis died, eliminating hopes of a potential director's commentary. Salvation sold its rights to Scorpion Releasing, which recorded an interview with writer Brian Comport and obtained a radio interview with Francis regarding the film to be included as special features. Vanessa Howard, having learned of the film's cult status, agreed to record a commentary for the DVD; however, Howard was terminally ill at the time, and she proved too weak to participate. The DVD was released on 30 March 2010, with remastered audio and video. Vanessa Howard died in October 2010, seven months after the film's release.

In 2012, Tightrope Theatre of Portland, OR, re-adapted the screenplay back into stage format and mounted what is purported to be the world premiere stage production of The Happy Family. Production dates were 11 May through 9 June 2012 at Tightrope Theatre's performance space in southeast Portland. The adaptation was done by Elizabeth Klinger, and the production was directed by James Peck. The cast included Jamie Rea, Rebecca Teran, David Cole, Elizabeth Klinger and Zachary Rouse. The production's stage manager was Lizz Esch Brown.

In 2015, an event was held at Oakley Court to pay tribute to Vanessa Howard and the production of the film. The event included the dedication of a memorial bench in Howard's memory, a trip to some of the film's shooting locations, and a dinner themed around the Family's meal with New Friend. In attendance was horror journalist Preston Fassel, the author of a biography on Howard that appeared in the Spring 2014 issue of Screem magazine; Fassel answered questions regarding the film's production and Howard's life.

Influence
Modern film critics have speculated that the film was a possible influence on Stanley Kubrick's 1980 film The Shining, particularly a scene in which Sonny chases one of the "friends" with an axe, hacking through the panel of a door and exposing his face to the room's occupant. Although a visually similar scene appears in the much earlier film The Phantom Carriage, the scene predates the "Here's Johnny" sequence in The Shining by over a decade.

References

External links 
 
 
 

1970 films
1970 comedy films
1970 horror films
1970s black comedy films
1970s British films
1970s comedy horror films
1970s English-language films
1970s serial killer films
British black comedy films
British comedy horror films
British serial killer films
Films about nannies
Films directed by Freddie Francis
Films set in country houses
Films set in England